Even Now is the fifth studio album by singer-songwriter Barry Manilow. It was recorded at A&M Studios in Hollywood, California, and released in 1978. The album reached triple platinum and spun off four hit singles in 1978 and early 1979: the title song, "Can't Smile Without You", "Copacabana" and "Somewhere in the Night" (which had previously been a hit in 1976 for Helen Reddy).

Track listing

Side one
"Copacabana (At the Copa)" (Barry Manilow, Bruce Sussman, Jack Feldman) - 5:46
"Somewhere in the Night" (Richard Kerr, Will Jennings) - 3:26
"A Linda Song" (Barry Manilow, Enoch Anderson) - 3:20
"Can't Smile Without You" (Chris Arnold, David Martin, Geoff Morrow) - 3:13
"Leavin' in the Morning" (Barry Manilow, Marty Panzer) - 3:25
"Where Do I Go From Here" (Parker McGee) - 3:07

Side two
"Even Now" (Barry Manilow, Marty Panzer) - 3:28
"I Was a Fool (To Let You Go)" (Barry Manilow, Marty Panzer) - 3:29
"Losing Touch" (Jack Feldman, Barry Manilow, Bruce Sussman) - 2:40
"I Just Want to Be the One in Your Life" (Michael Price, Dan Walsh) - 3:39
"Starting Again" (Barry Manilow, Marty Panzer) - 2:40
"Sunrise" (Barry Manilow, Adrienne Anderson) - 3:16

Bonus track (CD)
"I'm Comin' Home Again" (Bruce Roberts, Carole Bayer Sager) - 3:44
Bonus track – unfinished track – on 2006 Remaster
"No Love for Jenny" (Barry Manilow, Adrienne Anderson) - 2:46
Bonus track on 1996 and 2006 Remaster

Charts

Personnel
Barry Manilow – vocals, piano
Mitch Holder – guitar
Will Lee – bass
Bill Mays – keyboards
Ronnie Zito – drums
Alan Estes – percussion
Jeff Mironov – guitar on "Somewhere in the Night"
Bob Babbitt – bass on "Somewhere in the Night"
Paul Shaffer – electric piano on "Somewhere in the Night"
Jimmy Young – drums on "Somewhere in the Night"
Jimmy Maelen – percussion on "Somewhere in the Night"
Lee Ritenour – guitar on "A Linda Song"
Jay Graydon – guitar on "Sunrise"
Artie Butler, Dick Behrke, Richard Winzeler, Jimmie Haskell – orchestration

Certifications

References

Barry Manilow albums
1978 albums
Arista Records albums
Albums produced by Ron Dante
Albums recorded at A&M Studios